UK Islamic Mission (UKIM) is a registered charity and Islamic organization based in the United Kingdom. It is registered with the Charity Commission for England and Wales, and the Fundraising Standards Board (FRSB), the UK's independent regulator for charity fundraising.

UKIM that was formed in 1962 to "cater for the needs of a new growing Muslim community" in the UK. It started with the aim of meeting the needs of the British Muslim community by "establishing mosques for worship, catering for the religious education of children, organising religious and community functions, and producing basic literature on Islam in English."

History 
One of its longest standing members, who served as its President from 1966 to 1973, was Maulana Habib-ur Rahman from Manchester. In 2017, he died and his funeral service at the British Muslim Heritage Centre was attended by more than 3000 mourners. The Manchester Evening News described him in an obituary as "a much-loved imam who respected all religions", and someone who was "regarded a strong voice for interfaith dialogue"

In 1994, the British Muslims Monthly Survey noted that "UKIM has a long and distinguished reputation for building harmonious community relations wherever it operates." The BMMS also stated that the group is "active with students, settled communities and in da'wah work" and is "inspired by the Jamaat-e-Islami party in Pakistan" and the "Islamic revivalist teachings of Abul A'la Maududi and others." As of 2017, however, there is no reference to the Jamaat-e-Islami or Mawdudi on the UKIM website.

References

Further reading
 

Islamic organisations based in the United Kingdom
Islamist groups